Edwin Vincent O'Hara (September 6, 1881 – September 11, 1956) was an American prelate of the Roman Catholic Church.  He served as bishop of the Diocese of Great Falls in Montana from 1930 to 1939 and bishop of the Diocese of Kansas City in Missouri from 1939 to 1956.  He received the title of personal archbishop in 1954.

Biography

Early life 
Edwin O'Hara was born in Lanesboro, Minnesota, the youngest of Owen and Margaret O'Hara's eight children. His parents emigrated from Ireland during the Great Famine and settled in the United States. He attended a one-room school on land his father had donated, and later, graduated from Lanesboro High School. In 1897, O'Hara began studies at the College of St. Thomas in Saint Paul, Minnesota. O'Hara entered St. Paul's Seminary in 1900, before moving to Oregon City, Oregon.

Priesthood 
O'Hara was ordained to the priesthood on June 9, 1905, for the Diocese of Oregon City by Archbishop John Ireland. O'Hara began teaching Scripture and apologetics at St. Mary's Academy in Portland, Oregon. In 1907, he founded the Catholic Education Association of Oregon, and served as the superintendent of schools for the diocese. He formed the Dante Club at the Portland Public Library, where he gave lectures on history and the classics. In the face of considerable anti-Catholic bias, O'Hara sought to make Catholicism more visible in order to dispel inaccurate notions of what Catholics believe.

In 1910 O'Hara came down with bronchitis. Ordered by Archbishop Alexander Christie to take a rest, he traveled to Europe for six weeks with his sister Anna. Upon his return, he spent a semester taking classes at Catholic University in Washington, D.C. He returned to Portland in 1911.

Influenced by the views of Archbishop Ireland and Pope Leo XIII's encyclical Rerum novarum, O'Hara began to look into the living conditions of factory workers in Portland. Based on his research, O'Hara published a book which he then sent to public officials and newspapers. in 1913 Oregon past a minimum wage law. O'Hara was named chairman of the newly established Industrial Welfare Commission, which included both labor and management. The law was subsequently challenged but upheld by both the Oregon Supreme Court, and on appeal to the U.S. Supreme Court in the case Stettler v. O'Hara.

O'Hara served as a chaplain during World War I. After the war, O'Hara did pastoral work in the Archdiocese of Portland in Oregon, and was a leading force in enacting a minimum wage law through the state legislature in 1913; he later became the defendant in Stettler v. O'Hara when the law was tested and upheld in the U.S. Supreme Court in 1917. He was chosen to be chairman of Oregon's Industrial Welfare Commission in 1913 as well. In 1923, he became founder and director of the National Catholic Rural Life Conference, inspired by his ministry to those who lived in sparsely populated areas. According to him, "The Church is the biggest single factor in building up rural communities."

Bishop of Great Falls 
On August 6, 1930, O'Hara was appointed the second bishop of the Diocese of Great Falls by Pope Pius XI. He received his episcopal consecration on October 28, 1930, from Archbishop Edward Howard, with Bishops Charles White and Joseph Crimont serving as co-consecrators. In 1931, he was the only American bishop present when Pius XI delivered his encyclical Quadragesimo anno, and spoke for the United States as delegates from each nation reported the effects of Rerum novarum.

Bishop of Kansas City 
O'Hara was later named Bishop of Kansas City, Missouri, on April 15, 1939. In 1940, he derided physicist Albert Einstein after the latter expressed his disbelief in a personal god, saying, "It is sad to see a man, who comes from the race of the Old Testament and its teaching, deny the great tradition of that race". Within his first ten years as bishop, the diocese built or bought 42 churches, 31 rectories, 24 colleges, high schools, and grade schools, 14 convents, 8 social centers, and 6 hospitals. Of the 30 churches he constructed in rural counties, 25 of them had never had a Catholic church before.

O'Hara was considered to be theologically liberal, particularly in the fields of liturgy and social justice. A proponent of Catholic Action, he encouraged lay involvement and appointed laypeople to several top diocesan positions. Some believed he went too far in his promotion of the laity, leading even his own chancellor to resign in disapproval. O'Hara also led the effort to revise the Bible in simpler terms. On June 29, 1954, he was granted the personal title of archbishop.

Archbishop O'Hara died in Milan, Italy, shortly after his 75th birthday. He is buried in Kansas City.

See also
St. Mary Roman Catholic Church (Eugene, Oregon)
O'Hara Catholic School

References

Further reading

External links

 

1881 births
1956 deaths
Saint Paul Seminary School of Divinity alumni
Roman Catholic Archdiocese of Portland in Oregon
American Roman Catholic clergy of Irish descent
20th-century Roman Catholic bishops in the United States
American military chaplains
World War I chaplains
Roman Catholic bishops of Kansas City
Roman Catholic bishops of Great Falls
People from Lanesboro, Minnesota
Catholics from Minnesota